The A406 autoroute is a  long motorway in Mâcon, France. It was opened in 2008. It connects the RN79, and also the A6 motorway with the A40 motorway (connection Mâcon - Geneva, Switzerland via Bourg-en-Bresse).

References

External links

 A406 Motorway in Saratlas

A406